The Bancu (in its upper course: Băncușor) is a left tributary of the river Teșna in Romania. It flows into the Teșna in Românești.

References

Rivers of Romania
Rivers of Suceava County